Jacques Michaut (born 1946) was the temporary High Commissioner of the Republic in French Polynesia (Haut-Commissaire de la République en Polynésie française) from 30 July 2005, when he replaced Michel Mathieu, until 10 September 2005, when Anne Bouquet, the next commissioner, arrived in Tahiti.

References 
 Countries F. Rulers.org. Accessed 2011-02-12.
 French Polynesia government official website

1946 births
Living people
French Polynesian politicians
High Commissioners of the Republic in French Polynesia